The Trévaresse is a series of hilltops in the Bouches-du-Rhône, France.

They run from Saint-Cannat to Lambesc and are covered by many vineyards. The soil is made of clay and limestone. There is a former volcano, whose crater is the site of Château Beaulieu.

References

Landforms of Bouches-du-Rhône
Hills of France
Landforms of Provence-Alpes-Côte d'Azur